Hajji Qelich (also Romanized as Ḩājjī Qelīch; also known as Ḩājīqelīch) is a village in Bagheli-ye Marama Rural District, in the Central District of Gonbad-e Qabus County, Golestan Province, Iran. At the 2006 census, its population was 192, in 36 families.

References 

Populated places in Gonbad-e Kavus County